Miss Supranational 2017 was the ninth Miss Supranational pageant. It was held on December 1, 2017, at MOSIR Arena in Krynica-Zdrój, Poland. Srinidhi Shetty of India crowned Jenny Kim of Korea at the end of the event. She is the first winner from South Korea and the win is the first major title for her country.

Contestants from 65 countries and territories competed in this year's Miss Supranational pageant, The pageant was hosted by Davina Reeves and Iwan Podriez.

Background

On July 27, 2017, The organization of Miss Supranational is delighted to announce that the pageant will be held in two countries, Poland and Slovakia. The finals of Miss Supranational 2017 would be held on Friday 1 December at MOSIR Arena in the beautiful mountain resort of Krynica-Zdroj in Poland again.

Results

Placements

$- Vodi Fan Vote Winner which automatically advanced to the Top 25

∆- Facebook Winner which automatically advanced to Top 25

Continental Queens of Beauty

Order of announcements

Top 25

 Korea

Top 10

 Korea

Top 5

 Korea

Special awards

Contestants
65 contestants competed for the title.

References

External links 
 

2017
2017 beauty pageants